Takhti Ardabil is a multi-purpose stadium, located in Ardabil, Iran. It is used mostly for football matches. The stadium is able to hold 3,000 people. Takhti Ardabil is the home stadium of Shahrdari Ardabil. It is named after Gholamreza Takhti.

Football venues in Iran